The theory of decreasing responsibility is a life insurance philosophy that holds that individual financial responsibilities rise and then decline over the course of a lifetime and that life insurance amounts should reflect those changes. These responsibilities include paying consumer debts, mortgages, funding children's education and income replacement. It is promoted by proponents of term life insurance (as opposed to cash-value insurance).

Many financial responsibilities exist for a fixed time interval. Most mortgages cover a fixed number of years. Most children become independent adults. Further, most adults accumulate financial resources during their working life, whether in the form of home equity, savings, investments and/or pensions. For example, if a term insurance policy ends with retirement, the money used to pay premiums can be redirected to consumption, paying for an annuity, etc.

Typically, permanent (whole life) insurance costs at least five times more than term insurance. Investing the difference in a segregated fund/separate account policy allows the insured to access money in an emergency instead of taking a loan from the policy. Policy loans have high-interest rates and deplete the policy's adjusted cost basis (ACB), thus compromising its tax advantage.

"Buy term and invest the difference" implements the theory.

Canada 
The cash value built-in to a permanent insurance policy has a limited tax advantage depending on the ACB, while segregated funds registered as TFSA (Tax-Free Savings Account) or RRSP (Registered Retirement Savings Plan) offers a better tax advantage since both are registered government programs. If the cash value of a permanent policy has grown because of good fund management, the policy is likely to exceed the Maximum Tax Actuarial Reserve (MTAR), ending its tax-exemption. MTAR is used to stop the use of insurance as tax avoidance scheme.

Examples 

 A dependent spouse is stricken by blindness or other disability. Some term insurance provides a waiver of premium and terminal illness benefits which pay the insured about 40% to 70% of the coverage. Government Registered Segregated funds can also add to the disability benefits, besides the tax advantages. Disability may occur anytime before or after the term insurance expires. Instead of relying on policy loans from permanent insurance, segregated funds can provide for these emergencies. Policy loans only deplete both cash value and ACB (which make the policy taxable).
 A working couple, both with good incomes. The husband develops a disabling illness at age 55, and the spouse quits work to become his caregiver. Group life benefits are lost, and personal insurance is not held.  Accumulated savings and investments dwindle. He dies at age 59 with an outstanding mortgage and no life insurance.  By contrast, purchasing a whole life policy at age 35 (instead of the 20-year term plan) would have provided a substantial, tax-free resource. Premiums could have been paid through policy loans against the cash value.

 A 30-year-old purchases a 35-year $300,000 term policy typically costs between $40 to $50 per month. The difference is invested by maxing out the Tax-Free Savings account at $458.33 per month while RRSP contribution is $75 per month until age 65. Assuming a 6% investment performance of the segregated funds, a maximum of $3.981 monthly tax-free income from age 66 to 100 is possible. After 65 (retirement age), RRSP continues to max out TFSA contribution at $5500/year.

However, if this were permanent insurance, this 30-year-old can only access a cash value loan in retirement. This loan reduces both the death benefits and the ACB (the tax-free portion of the cash value). When the ACB is depleted, the insurance loses its tax advantage. i.e., the insurance policy becomes a taxable endowment. This also happens when the policy fails the annual MTAR test.

In most Insured Retirement Plans, cash value loan is collateralized through a third party lender and annuities as tax-free retirement income. Technically the loan becomes a tax fraud waiting to be discovered absent the intention or means to repay the loan. If the 3rd party lender and the insurance company have the same owner, they exhibit a conflict of interest.

References

Life insurance